Iotaphora iridicolor is a species of moth of the family Geometridae found in China, India, Bhutan.

References

Moths described in 1880
Geometrinae